Arthur Moritz Schoenflies (17 April 1853 – 27 May 1928), sometimes written as Schönflies, was a German mathematician, known for his contributions to the application of group theory to crystallography, and for work in topology.

Schoenflies was born in Landsberg an der Warthe (modern Gorzów, Poland). Arthur Schoenflies married Emma Levin (1868–1939) in 1896. He studied under Ernst Kummer and Karl Weierstrass, and was influenced by Felix Klein.

The Schoenflies problem is to prove that an -sphere in Euclidean n-space bounds a topological ball, however embedded. This question is much more subtle than it initially appears.

He studied at the University of Berlin from 1870 to 1875. He obtained a doctorate in 1877, and in 1878 he was a teacher at a school in Berlin. In 1880, he went to Colmar to teach.

Schoenflies was a frequent contributor to Klein's encyclopedia: In 1898 he wrote on set theory, in 1902 on kinematics, and on projective geometry in 1910.

He was a great-uncle of Walter Benjamin.

Selected works
 Geometrie der Bewegung in synthetischer Darstellung. Teubner, 1886; translated by Charles Speckel as La Géométrie du Mouvement. Exposé synthétique. Gauthier-Villars 1893
 Einführung in die mathematische Behandlung der Naturwissenschaft. 1st edition, Dr. E. Wolff, 1895; 2nd editions 1931 (with Walther Nernst)
 Entwicklung der Mengenlehre und ihrer Anwendungen. Teubner, 1913 (with Hans Hahn).
Kristallsysteme und Kristallstruktur, Teubner 1891
 Theorie der Kristallstruktur. Ein Lehrbuch. Gebr. Borntraeger, 1923.
Einführung in die Hauptgesetze der zeichnerischen Darstellungsmethoden, Teubner 1908, Project Gutenberg ebook
Articles: Mengenlehre (1898), Projektive Geometrie (1909), Kinematik (1902), Kristallographie (with Theodor Liebisch, Otto Mügge), in Klein's encyclopedia.

See also
Fyodorov–Schoenflies–Bieberbach theorem
Jordan–Schoenflies theorem
Schoenflies notation
Schoenflies displacement
Heine–Borel theorem

References

External links
 
 
 

1853 births
1928 deaths
People from Gorzów Wielkopolski
People from the Province of Brandenburg
19th-century German mathematicians
20th-century German mathematicians
Jewish scientists
Humboldt University of Berlin alumni
Academic staff of the University of Königsberg
Burials at Frankfurt Main Cemetery
Topologists
Geometers